Ford's Garage is an American chain of casual dining restaurants founded in 2012. The first restaurant was opened in Fort Myers, Florida. As of July 2022, the company had 21 restaurants in four states, the majority of which are operated by 23 Restaurant Services. The chain has a licensing agreement with the Ford Motor Company that allows it to use the Ford name and the carmaker's logo.

History 
In 2012, co-founders Mike McGuigan, Daniel Kearns, President of the Kearns Restaurant Group as well as his son, Zak Kearns(Vice President), opened the first Ford's Garage restaurant in Fort Myers, Florida.
 
In May 2013, the company applied to trademark its name as Ford's Garage Venture LLC. The U.S. Patent and Trademark Office denied the application, because the name was too similar to the trademark held by the Ford Motor Company. One year later in 2014, the restaurant chain signed a deal with the Ford Motor Company enabling it to use Ford's trademark "Blue Oval" logo and other insignia in its restaurants.
 
In 2017, Ford's Garage opened their first restaurant outside Florida in Dearborn, Michigan, the birthplace of the motor company's founder Henry Ford. The restaurant in Dearborn is located within the property of the Ford Motor Company and is less than two miles away from the company's international headquarters.

Sister restaurants 
Ford's Garage's sister restaurants include Yeoman's Topgolf Swing Suite, Tiki Docks, Don The Beachcomber, The Firestone, Capone's Coal Fired Pizza, Cabos Cantina, The Lodge, The Boathouse Tiki Bar & Grill, The downtown social house, Izzy’s Fish & Oyster, all located in Florida.

See also 
 Ford Motor Company

References

External links 
 Official website

Hamburger restaurants
Restaurant chains in the United States
Restaurants established in 2012
Restaurants in Florida
Restaurants in Michigan
2012 establishments in Florida
Fort Myers, Florida